Bishop of Daejeon may refer to:

The bishop of the Anglican Diocese of Daejeon, South Korea
The bishop of the Roman Catholic Diocese of Daejeon, South Korea

Note: despite the differences of spelling above, Daejeon and Taejeon are different variants of spelling of the same city in South Korea.